LewisHugh Oswald  Pryce (1 August 1873 – 30 September 1930) was a Welsh Anglican priest in the first third of the 20th century who rose to become Archdeacon of Wrexham.

The son of Shadrach Pryce, Dean of St Asaph from 1899 to 1910, he was educated at Clifton College  and Pembroke College, Cambridge.  He was ordained Deacon in 1896; and Priest in 1897. After curacies in Lampeter and Brecon he held incumbencies in Wrexham and  Bistre. He was Warden of Ruthin from 1909 to 1916; Vicar of Colwyn Bay from 1916 to 1923; and Rural Dean of Wrexham from 1923 until his appointment as Archdeacon.

References

1873 births
People educated at Clifton College
Alumni of Pembroke College, Cambridge
Welsh Anglicans
Archdeacons of Wrexham
1930 deaths